Gorky Motorcycle Plant (GMZ) was a motorcycle manufacturer, based in Gorkiy (nowadays Nizhniy Novgorod), existing from 1941 to 1949.

History
Gorky Motorcycle Plant commenced operations in 1941 with the transfer of plant and equipment from Kharkov Motorcycle Plant (KhMZ) and Leningrad Motorcycle Plant (LMZ), which was necessitated by the German armies threatening Kiev and Leningrad.

Production ceased in 1949 and all plant and equipment was transferred to KMZ (КМЗ) in Kiev. About 100 employees moved to Kyiv as well.

References 

 "Entsiklopediya Mototsiklov. Firmi. Modeli. Konstruktsii.", Za Rulem, Moscow (2003). Энциклопедия Мотоциклов. Фирмы. Модели. Конструкции. - За Рулем - Москва (2003) 
 History of Kiev Motorcycle Plant 

Motorcycle manufacturers of the Soviet Union
Defunct motorcycle manufacturers of Russia
Manufacturing companies based in Nizhniy Novgorod
Vehicle manufacturing companies disestablished in 1949
Vehicle manufacturing companies established in 1941
1941 establishments in the Soviet Union
1949 disestablishments in the Soviet Union